Pseudisobrachium is a genus of cuckoo wasps in the family Bethylidae. There are about six described species in Pseudisobrachium.

Species
These six species belong to the genus Pseudisobrachium:
 Pseudisobrachium carbonarium b
 Pseudisobrachium fialai Hoffer, 1936 g
 Pseudisobrachium intermedium Kieffer, 1904 g
 Pseudisobrachium prolongatum b
 Pseudisobrachium pubescens Kieffer, 1906 g
 Pseudisobrachium subcyaneum (Haliday, 1838) g
Data sources: i = ITIS, c = Catalogue of Life, g = GBIF, b = Bugguide.net

References

Further reading

External links

 

Parasitic wasps
Chrysidoidea